Hirwaun, Penderyn and Rhigos (formerly two separate wards Hirwaun and Rhigos) is the northernmost electoral ward in Rhondda Cynon Taf, Wales. It covers the communities of Hirwaun (including the village of Penderyn) and Rhigos. The ward elects two county borough councillors to the Rhondda Cynon Taf County Borough Council. It is the largest ward in Rhondda Cynon Taf.

While being the largest ward in Rhondda Cynon Taf, Rhigos was also one of the least populous. According to the 2011 census the population of the Rhigos ward was 1,700.

2022 ward changes
The area around the village of Hirwaun was formerly an electoral ward in its own right. Following a local government boundary review, Hirwaun was merged with the much larger Rhigos ward to become 'Hirwaun, Penderyn and Rhigos'. The number of councillors for the ward increased from one to two. This was effective from the May 2022 local elections.

Local elections

Karen Morgan had been councillor for the Hirwaun ward prior to the election.

The Rhigos ward formerly elected one councillor to Rhondda Cynon Taf County Borough Council.

References

Wards of Rhondda Cynon Taf